Akhvakhsky District is an administrative and municipal district (raion), one of the forty-one in the Republic of Dagestan, Russia. It is located in the west of the republic. Its administrative center is the rural locality (a selo) of Karata. As of the 2010 Census, the total population of the district was 22,014, with the population of Karata accounting for 18.9% of that number.

Administrative and municipal status
Within the framework of administrative divisions, Akhvakhsky District is one of the forty-one in the Republic of Dagestan. The district is divided into seven selsoviets which comprise twenty-five rural localities.  As a municipal division, the district is incorporated as Akhvakhsky Municipal District. Its seven selsoviets are incorporated as thirteen rural settlements within the municipal district. The selo of Karata serves as the administrative center of both the administrative and municipal district.

References

Notes

Sources



Districts of Dagestan